Malibu Country is an American sitcom that ran on ABC from November 2, 2012, to March 22, 2013. The series was created by David A. Stewart and marks Reba McEntire's return to series television, following up her previous sitcom Reba (2001–2007).

McEntire stars as Reba MacKenzie, who recently discovered her country music star-husband has been cheating on her, and the two divorce. As part of the divorce settlement, she moves to a house her ex-husband owns in Malibu, California and attempts to restart her music career while also starting a new chapter in her family's lives. Malibu Country'''s producer Kevin Abbott  is a former Reba producer, and McEntire serves as an executive producer for the series.

On April 23, 2013, it was announced that Nastaran Dibai, who took over as writer and producer after Abbott left in October 2012, had departed as well from the show.

On May 10, 2013, ABC cancelled the series after one season.

Overview
After finding that her husband has been cheating on her, Reba MacKenzie and her family move from Nashville, Tennessee, to Malibu, California, in an attempt to restart her music career and start a new chapter in their lives.

Cast and characters

Main cast
 Reba as Reba Gallagher (née MacKenzie), a mother of two kids, and a former country music sensation trying to get her foot back in the door
 Lily Tomlin as Lillie Mae MacKenzie, Reba's no-nonsense mother 
 Sara Rue as Kim Sallinger, Reba's hug-too-freely, share-too-much, upbeat neighbor
 Justin Prentice as Cash Gallagher, Reba's teenage son
 Juliette Angelo as June Gallagher, Reba's teenage daughter
 Jai Rodriguez as Geoffrey, a record label assistant Reba turns to for help getting her career back on track

Recurring cast
 Jeffrey Nordling as Bobby Gallagher, a country music star and Reba's ex-husband
 Hudson Thames as Sage, Kim's teenage step-son and June's boyfriend
 Larry Wilmore as Mr. Clark, Cash and June's school principal
 James Patrick Stuart as Mr. Bata, the head of the record company where Geoffrey works

Guest stars
 Travie McCoy as himself ("Shell Games") 
 Steven Weber as Pete Mason ("Bro Code")
 Heather Dubrow as Brooke ("Cold Shower")
 Laura Bell Bundy as Shauna ("Adventures in Babysitting") 
 Tisha Campbell-Martin as Rikki ("Bowling for Mama")
 Owen Teague as Jack ("Oh Comedy")
 Blake Shelton as Blake MacKenzie ("Oh Brother")
 Enrico Colantoni as Leslie, Kim's husband ("Marriage, Malibu Style")
 Stacy Keach as Brad, a date of Reba and Lillie Mae ("All You Single Ladies")

Episodes

Development and productionMalibu Country was originally a series in development for ABC. The pilot episode was scheduled to shoot on April 17, 2012, at ABC Studios. McEntire was selected to play Reba McKenzie, a divorced mother of two who moves to Malibu, California, to restart her music career.ABC tunes up Reba McEntire pilot, 'Malibu Country', Entertainment Weekly

It was announced on February 23, 2012, that Lily Tomlin would join the series, playing the role of McEntire's character's mother, Lillie Mae. On March 1, 2012, Sara Rue was added to the cast. She portrays Kim, a neighbor to Reba and Lillie, who is a very upbeat share-too-much, hug-too-freely trophy wife and neighbor with a teenage stepson who may or may not be gay. On March 8, 2012, Justin Prentice and Juliette Angelo were cast as Reba's teenage son and daughter, Cash and June respectively. On March 28, 2012, Jai Rodriguez was cast as Geoffrey, a record label assistant in town whom Reba contacts to restart her music career.

On May 11, 2012, ABC placed a series order for the comedy. The series premiered on Friday, November 2, 2012 at 8:30 p.m., following the season premiere of Last Man Standing. On November 12, 2012, ABC picked up an additional three scripts for Malibu Country. It was announced on November 28, 2012, that ABC increased the episode order for season one from thirteen to eighteen episodes.

Reception

Critical reception
The series has received mixed to negative reviews from critics. The series currently has a score of 41 out of 100 on Metacritic, citing mixed or average reviews.

Ratings
The series premiere received 9.13 million viewers, and a 2.3 in the coveted 18–49 rating share, up 1 million viewers from its lead in, the season premiere of Last Man Standing. The premiere scored ABC's highest numbers in the half hour in almost five years. As of November 27, 2012, the first season episode order has been expanded from 13 to 18, with ABC also announcing that Malibu Country'' is the highest-rated freshman comedy on television in the 2012 fall season with an average of 8.7 million viewers per episode.

References

External links

2010s American sitcoms
2012 American television series debuts
2013 American television series endings
American Broadcasting Company original programming
English-language television shows
Television series by ABC Studios
Television shows set in Malibu, California
Television series created by David A. Stewart